is a near-Earth asteroid classified as a potentially hazardous asteroid of the Apollo group. During the day before closest approach,  reached a peak apparent magnitude of 11.7 and was visible to ground-based observers with telescope apertures of at least . It is the largest and one of the fastest asteroids to approach Earth within  in 2021.

With an observation arc of 20 years,  has a well-determined orbit, and its trajectory is well known through the year 2196. The asteroid's orbit is only potentially hazardous on a time scale of thousands of years.

Discovery 
 was discovered on 23 March 2001 by the Lincoln Near-Earth Asteroid Research (LINEAR) at Lincoln Laboratory's Experimental Test Site in Socorro, New Mexico. The asteroid was first observed in the constellation Hydra at an apparent magnitude of 15.6. Shortly after discovery, follow-up observations were carried out by four other observatories until the asteroid's subsequent confirmation by the Minor Planet Center on 24 March 2003. The asteroid was given the provisional designation  and was recognized as a potentially hazardous asteroid. The accredited LINEAR observers are M. Blythe, F. Shelly, M. Bezpalko, R. Huber, L. Manguso, and S. Adams.

Orbit and classification 

 is a member of the dynamical Apollo group of Earth-crossing near-Earth asteroids with orbital semi-major axes greater than 1 astronomical unit (AU). It follows a highly elongated orbit around the Sun at a distance of 0.3–3.1 AU once every 2.22 years (810 days; semi-major axis of 1.7 AU). Its orbit has a high eccentricity of 0.83 and an inclination of ° with respect to the ecliptic. With its highly eccentric orbit, it crosses the orbits of all four inner planets of the Solar System.

The asteroid's orbit is only potentially hazardous on a time scale of thousands of years.

Close approaches 
Over the course of its highly eccentric orbit,  makes numerous close encounters with the inner planets—most often Mercury, Venus, and Earth.

During the few days leading up to closest approach,  steadily became brighter and peaked at apparent magnitude 11.7 on 21 March 2021 2:00 UTC. Although its maximum brightness was too faint to be seen with the naked eye, it was visible to observers using telescopes with apertures of at least . By the time  makes its closest approach to Earth, its solar elongation (angular separation from the Sun) would be 64°, too small to be observable from Earth.

In the next 100 years,  will not make any close approaches to Earth closer than the 21 March 2021 encounter.

Observations 
Preliminary observations by NEOWISE show that  appears to be faint in infrared wavelengths of light, indicating that the asteroid is likely less than 1 kilometer in diameter. Near-infrared spectral data obtained by NASA's Infrared Telescope Facility in 2018 suggests that  is a stony asteroid classified under the Sr spectral class.

 was first observed with radar on 21 March 2021 at Canberra, Australia and Narrabri, New South Wales, which provided refinement of its orbit. One day after its closest approach, bistatic radar observations were carried out by NASA's Goldstone Deep Space Communications Complex in California and Green Bank Telescope in West Virginia. The radar images revealed that the asteroid has a bilobate shape.

The preliminary photometry indicates that the body is tumbling with a long main rotation period of  hours.

References

External links 
 Goldstone Radar Observations of Asteroid 2001 FO32, Jet Propulsion Laboratory, 5 April 2021
 Asteroid 2001 FO32 Will Safely Pass by Earth March 21, Tony Greicius, NASA, 11 March 2021
 Asteroid Lightcurve Database (LCDB), query form (info )
 
 
 

231937
231937
231937
231937
231937
20210321
20010323
231937